Fort Buchanan was built in 1857 as a combination town and fort by Capt. Richard Mobley, who was sympathetic to the cause to see Kansas Territory admitted to the Union as a slave state. The fort/town consisted of eight log cabins built around a town square.

Apparently the Mobley family occupied two of the cabins. After the death of their small child they moved to Ogden, Kansas, and the site remained abandoned until fall 1857. A family had received permission to occupy Buchanan through the winter and left sometime after the end of 1857. By March 1859 the site was again occupied and remained so until at least spring 1860. The site was gradually abandoned and some of the cabins may have been moved away. After that Buchanan was not again occupied.

References

Buchanan
Ottawa County, Kansas
1857 establishments in Kansas Territory